Grapevine is a populated place situated in Gila County, Arizona, United States.

References

Populated places in Gila County, Arizona